The first-seeds Daphne Akhurst and Jim Willard successfully defended their title by defeating the second seeded Sylvia Harper and Bob Schlesinger 6–4, 6–4 in the final, to win the mixed doubles tennis title at the 1925 Australasian Championships.

Seeds

  Daphne Akhurst /  Jim Willard (champions)
  Sylvia Harper /  Bob Schlesinger (final)
  Esna Boyd /  Gar Hone (semifinals)
  Kathleen Le Messurier /  Les Baker (semifinals)

Draw

Finals

Earlier rounds

Section 1

Section 2

References

External links
 Source for seedings
 Source for the draw

1925 in Australian tennis